Hydrograd is the sixth and most recent studio album by American rock band Stone Sour. Recorded at Sphere Studios in Los Angeles, it is the follow-up to the band's 2012–2013 double concept album, House of Gold & Bones Part 1 and 2. It was released worldwide on June 30, 2017 via Roadrunner Records. Hydrograd also had a special album premiere with commentary on each song from frontman Corey Taylor on June 29, 2017 on Octane (Sirius XM). Two singles were released in promotion of the album ahead of its release: "Fabuless" and "Song #3". A third single, "Rose Red Violent Blue (This Song Is Dumb & So Am I)", was released on September 13, 2017. On October 24, 2017, Hydrograd won the award for Hard Rock Album of the Year at the Loudwire Music Awards. On April 4, 2018, the album's fourth single, “St. Marie” was released. Hydrograd is the first album to be produced without founding guitarist Jim Root, as he departed Stone Sour in 2014 to focus more on his and Corey's other band Slipknot. On August 23, 2018, the album's fifth single, "Knievel Has Landed" has been released. Hydrograd is the last album the band released before they entered an indefinite hiatus in 2020.

Background
According to Johny Chow, the record is said to be a departure from previous Stone Sour albums, more of a rock-and-roll album. He also mentions that the album has more of a groove feel to it and very melodic with large choruses added to it. A total of 19 songs were recorded, with 15 making the final cut on the standard edition, while the other 4 were later released on the deluxe version.

Critical reception

Reviews for Hydrograd were very positive. Ali Cooper of Rock Sins gave the record a 10 out of 10, calling it a risk-taking gem for Stone Sour and Slipknot fans.

Commercial performance
Hydrograd debuted at number eight on the US Billboard 200 with 33,000 album-equivalent units, with 30,000 of that figure coming from pure album sales. Hydrograd would go on to win Hard Rock Album of the Year in the 2017 Loudwire Music Awards

Track listing
All lyrics written by Corey Taylor; all music composed and performed by Stone Sour.

Personnel
Stone Sour
Corey Taylor – lead vocals, guitars, backing vocals, art direction
Josh Rand – guitars, backing vocals, art direction
Christian Martucci – guitars, backing vocals, talk-box on "Live Like You're on Fire", art direction
Johny Chow – bass, backing vocals, art direction
Roy Mayorga – drums, backing vocals, art direction

Additional personnel
 Sergei Ponzirelli – voice-over on "YSIF"
 Pearl Aday – backing vocals on "St. Marie"
 Joel Martin – Pedal steel guitar on "St. Marie"
 Dan Kaneyuki – orchestral musician
 Brian Mantz – orchestral musician
 Megan Milius – backing vocals
 George Adrian – backing vocals
 Alejandro Baima – backing vocals
 Francesco Cameli – backing vocals
 Rem Massingill – backing vocals
 Jason Christopher – backing vocals
 Matthew "Stubs" Phillips – backing vocals

Technical personnel
Jay Ruston − producer, engineering, mixing
Francesco Cameli – engineering
Alejndo Baima – engineering
John Douglass – additional engineering
Paul Logus – mastering
Ron "REM" Massingill – guitar and bass technician 
Jon Nicholson – drum technician
Gary Myerberg – studio technician
 Invisible Creature, INC. – art direction
Ryan Clark (for Invisible Creature, INC.) – album design
 Travis Shinn – photography

Charts

Weekly charts

Year-end charts

References

Stone Sour albums
Roadrunner Records albums
2017 albums